is a railway station in Shintomi, Miyazaki, Japan.

Lines

Layout 
The station consists of an island platform serving two tracks at grade with two sidings. The station building is modern structure built in 1992 from local materials and designed with elements to resemble the town logo as well as an agricultural green house, recalling the key economic activity of the town. It houses a staffed ticket window and a waiting area. Access to the island platform is by means of a footbridge. A bike shed is provided at the station forecourt. The station is not staffed by JR Kyushu but some types of tickets are available from a kan'i itaku agent on site who staffs the ticket window.

Adjacent stations

History
In 1913, the  had opened a line from  northwards to Hirose (now closed). After the Miyazaki Prefectural Railway was nationalized on 21 September 1917, Japanese Government Railways (JGR) undertook the subsequent extension of the track as part of the then Miyazaki Main Line. In the first phase of expansion, the track was extended north from Jirogabyū (now  to Takanabe which opened on 11 September 1920 as the new northern terminus. Expanding north from Takanabe in phases and joining up with other networks, the track eventually reached  and the entire stretch from Kokura through this station to Miyakonojō was redesignated as the Nippō Main Line on 15 December 1923. On 20 March 1961, the station was renamed from Minashiro to Hyūga-Shintomi. With the privatization of Japanese National Railways (JNR), the successor of JGR, on 1 April 1987, the station came under the control of JR Kyushu.

Passenger statistics
In fiscal 2016, the station was used by an average of 287 passengers (boarding only) per day.

Surrounding area
JASDF Nyutabaru Air Base - 5 km to the west of the station. A Lockheed T-33 trainer aircraft is on display outside the station building. It belonged to the 202nd Tactical Fighter Squadron (JASDF) which was stationed at Nyutabaru.

See also
List of railway stations in Japan

References

External links
Hyūga-Shintomi (JR Kyushu)

Railway stations in Miyazaki Prefecture
Railway stations in Japan opened in 1920